HMAS Brisbane (DDG 41), named after the city of Brisbane, Queensland, is the second ship of the Hobart-class air warfare destroyers used by the Royal Australian Navy (RAN).

Construction
The ship was built at ASC's shipyard in Osborne, South Australia from modules fabricated by ASC, BAE Systems Australia in Victoria, and Forgacs Group in New South Wales. She was laid down on 3 February 2014 and launched on 15 December 2016.

Brisbane commenced sea trials in November 2017. She was handed over to the RAN on 27 July 2018.

Operational service

Brisbane was commissioned on 27 October 2018. The destroyer completed its weapons trials in March 2019. On 6 April 2019 Brisbanes crew conducted a Freedom of Entry parade through the Brisbane central business district. In September 2019 the ship was deployed to the United States to use US Navy ranges off southern California for combat systems testing.

In October 2021, a MH-60R Seahawk that was operating from Brisbane made an emergency landing into the Philippine Sea shortly after taking off during an exercise. The crew survived and were rescued. A RAAF transport aircraft subsequently flew a replacement Seahawk to Japan, and Brisbane put in at Yokosuka to embark it.

References

Hobart-class destroyers
Ships built in South Australia
2016 ships